Chowan Hospital is a critical access hospital located in Edenton, North Carolina. It is a part of the ECU Health system. In 1947 Chowan Hospital opened. It moved in 1950 and again to its present position in 1970. A wing was added in 1988. It joined with UHSEC in 1998. The Emergency Department at Pitt County Memorial Hospital was linked to Chowan Hospital in April 2001.  The hospital has 49 general hospital beds and 40 general nursing home beds.  It also has three Shared Inpatient/Ambulatory Surgery and one Endoscopy operating rooms.

References

External links 
 Vidant Chowan Hospital

Hospital buildings completed in 1950
Hospital buildings completed in 1970
Hospitals in North Carolina
Buildings and structures in Chowan County, North Carolina